Salman al-Murshid (1907 – 16 December 1946) was a Syrian Alawi religious figure, political leader, and the founder of al-Murshidiyah religious sect.

Early beginnings
Salman al-Murshid was born as Salman Yunus in the village of Jawbat Burghal, in the Latakia Sanjak.

His emerging power worried both local notable Alawite families and the French authorities, who arranged to have him and some of his followers sent to Raqqa in exile in the mid-1920s. Yet when al-Murshid returned, he managed to patch up his problems with local notables.

In 1937, he became a member of Parliament, and avoided the separatist approach advocated for by some among Syria's minority groups. Yet once it appeared that the French would not make good on their promise to grant Syria independence in 1936, al-Murshid began to call for هndependence again. In 1943, he was elected again as a member of the central Syrian Parliament.

In 1944, under British instigation, al-Murshid was arrested in Beirut and kept in Damascus under house arrest for a few months.

The Syrian government tried to charge him with treason and other civil charges, but they could not prove any of the charges. Hence, the Judge received a direct order from the president, Shukri al-Quwatli, to convict Salman by any means, and he was executed on 16 December 1946 in Marjeh Square in Damascus.

Followers
His movement respect al-Murshid and, following his death, his sons Mujib and Saji. The followers of al-Murshid later became known as Al-Murshidiyah named after his second son Mujib Al-Murshid, who was killed by Abd Elhak Shihada, a military police commander, (by direct order from Adib Shishakli) on 27 November 1952. Murshidians were persecuted by the Syrian authorities until  President Hafez al-Assad came to power in 1970. Since then, Al-Murshidyah was practiced relatively freely like any other religion.  After the 1984 confrontation between Hafez al-Assad and his younger brother Rifaat al-Assad, the Al-Murshid family was allowed to return to the Latakia region. Murshidiya soldiers in Rifaat's Defense Companies had sided with the President in the confrontation.

Murshidians only exist in Syria in which they mostly spread out in Latakia Governorate, Homs Governorate, Al-Ghab Plain and Damascus. Their numbers may vary from 300 to 500 thousand people. They celebrate a festival called "Joy in God" for three days, starting from 25 August of each year, this day commemorates the beginning of the new religion by Mujib al-Murshid. In these three days, people make private prayers, dress well and offer desserts as a way of celebration.

References

Sources
 لمحات حول المرشدية 
 Shoaa Kapl Al Fajer (Mozakerat Ahmed Nehad Al Sayyaf)- Muhammad Jamal Barut, 2005 شعاع قبل الفجر: تقديم وتحقيق: الكاتب والناقد محمد جمال لـ " مذكرات احمد نهاد السياف
 https://web.archive.org/web/20080226055816/http://www.odabasham.net/show.php?sid=11934 
 https://web.archive.org/web/20110715140524/http://magazine.qunaya.com/modules.php?name=News&file=article&sid=291 
 http://www.marmarita.com/vb/showpost.php?p=40901&postcount=1 

1907 births
1946 deaths
People from Latakia Governorate
Syrian Alawites
Members of the People's Assembly of Syria
People executed by Syria by hanging